The  was a Japanese boarding high school in Kientzheim (now a part of Kaysersberg-Vignoble), Haut-Rhin, in the Alsace region of France, near Colmar. It was operated by Seijo Gakuen, an educational society affiliated with Seijo University, and therefore was an overseas branch of a Japanese private school, or a Shiritsu zaigai kyoiku shisetsu (私立在外教育施設).

History
In the 1980s officials in the Alsace region sent an invitation for a Japanese school to establish itself there as a way of attracting Japanese companies to establish operations in the region. The director of the Alsace Development Agency, Andre Klein, received contacts from several Japanese educational institutions after he had asked a Nihon Keizai Shimbun reporter to write an article about a possible site for an overseas Japanese boarding school: a former convent in Kientzheim. Seijo Gakuen, the organization controlling Seijo University, accepted the offer. It wanted to establish a Japanese school in 1987 to celebrate its 70th anniversary. In 1984 negotiations to establish the school finished successfully.

The school opened in April 1986. The first principal was Jokichi Moroga. After the school opened Sony decided to open a factory in Alsace. Other Japanese companies including Ricoh followed.

In 1990 and 1991 the school had 180 students in grades 7 through 12. The school's enrollment declined due to a declining Japanese birthrate and a decreased economic presence of Japanese companies in France, due to the recession in Japan. On Friday February 11, 2005 the school held its final graduation ceremony, with 13 students graduating. In the school's history a total of 556 students had graduated. The European Centre for Japanese Studies in Alsace (CEEJA,  Aruzasu Ōshū Nihongaku Kenkyūsho) opened at the site of the former school.

Curriculum
Lycée Seijo used the same curriculum as the Seijo Gakuen Junior High School and High School and the courses were taught in Japanese.

Student body
During the school's lifetime, according to the Western Society for French History, the "core" of the student body consisted of children of executives working for offices of Japanese multinational companies such as Sharp Corporation and Sony in the Alsace region. In addition, some students were from Japanese families living in Paris. Other students' families lived in other places including Germany, Italy, the Soviet Union, other areas in Europe, Africa, and Australia. Some students' families lived in Japan, and the families sent them to Lycée Seijo to gain experience living outside Japan. Some students' families lived elsewhere in Asia. As of 1990, about 66% of the students had families resident outside Japan while the remainder had families resident in Japan.

Student life
All of the students lived in the school dormitories. Karl Schoenberger of the Los Angeles Times wrote that the Seijo students "on the whole" were "isolated" at the school even though during athletic meetings they had some interaction with French children.

Extracurricular activities and community relations
Because the school, with about 200 Japanese students and teachers at the time of opening, was located in a community of 800, the school leadership took steps to develop good relationships with the host community. Therefore the school asked its students to participate in the marathon sponsored by the village and the school held "open house" days for the local community.

The school established a Japanese cultural center in nearby Colmar, which housed books and printed materials in Japan and hosted lectures about Japan and film screenings.

Notable students
 The second eldest son of Tsutomu Hata, who was one of the first to graduate from this school

See also

 Japanese people in France
French international schools in Japan:
 Lycée Français International de Tokyo
 Lycée Français de Kyoto

References

Further reading
 "Kientzheim, l'Ecole des Cracks" (Archive). Le Nouvel Observateur, Issues 1248-1260. 1988. p. 15. "C'est ici qu'en 1985 s'est ouvert le lycée Seijo, pour les enfants de la diaspora japonaise. Les 20000 mètres carrés de l'école du SacréCœur menaçaient de tomber en ruine, faute de bonnes sœurs. Le département et André Klein, directeur du[...]"
 "Les crécelles de Seijo." (Archive) L'Alsace. Tuesday 8 June 1999.
 "Seijo fête la rentrée." (Archive) Dernières Nouvelles d'Alsace (DNA). Sunday 18 April 1999.
 "La rentrée au lycée Seijo." (Archive) L'Alsace. Sunday 18 April 1999.
 "Seijo ouvre ses portes." (Archive) L'Alsace. Sunday 7 November 1999.
  Nakatani, Keiko (中谷 圭子 Nakatani Keiko) (アルザス成城学園前校長). "The History of Lycee Seijo d'Alsace : from 1998 to closing" (アルザス成城学園の歴史 : 1998年から閉校まで). Annual reports, Seijo Gakuen Education Institute (Seijo University) 30, 1-58, 2008-03. See profile at CiNii
  Tanabe, Kan (田辺 幹 Tanabe Kan), Haruo Shinkai (新海 治夫 Shinkai Haruo), and Shinichi Nakazawa (中沢 慎一 Nakazawa Shin'ichi) (all staff of Lycée Seijo). "A Cooperative Study English Teaching at Lycee seijo d'Alsace" (<共同研究>アルザス成城学園における英語教育). Annual reports, Seijo Gakuen Education Institute (Seijo University) 18, 176-210, 1996-03. See profile at CiNii.
 Gauthier, Nicole. "Les entreprises japonaises s'épanouissent en Alsace" (Archive). Libération. 9 July 2001.

External links
 Lycée Seijo  (2003-2006)
 Lycée Seijo  (2001-2003)
 Lycée Seijo  (2000)
 Lycée Seijo  - Index of newspaper articles
 Lycée Seijo  (???)
 European Centre for Japanese Studies in Alsace
 "アルザス成城学園中等部・高等部卒業生の皆様へ" (Archive). Seijo Gakuen.

Japanese international schools in France
Educational institutions established in 1986
1986 establishments in France
Educational institutions disestablished in 2005
2005 disestablishments in France
Lycées in Haut-Rhin
Boarding schools in France
Schools in Grand Est
Defunct shiritsu zaigai kyōiku shisetsu in Europe